2223 Sarpedon  is a dark Jupiter trojan from the Trojan camp, approximately  in diameter. It was discovered on 4 October 1977, by astronomers at the Purple Mountain Observatory near Nanking, China. The D-type asteroid belongs to the 30 largest Jupiter trojans and has a rotation period of 22.7 hours. It was named after the Lycian hero Sarpedon from Greek mythology.

Orbit and classification 

Sarpedon is orbiting in the trailing Trojan camp, at Jupiter's  Lagrangian point, 60° behind its orbit in a 1:1 resonance . It is also a non-family asteroid of the Jovian background population.

It orbits the Sun at a distance of 5.2–5.3 AU once every 11 years and 12 months (4,376 days; semi-major axis of 5.24 AU). Its orbit has an eccentricity of 0.02 and an inclination of 16° with respect to the ecliptic. The body's observation arc begins with its official discovery observation at Nanking.

Physical characteristics 

In the Tholen classification, Sarpedon is similar to a dark D-type asteroid, though with an unusual spectrum (DU).

Rotation period 

In April 1996, a rotational lightcurve of Sarpedon was obtained from photometric observations by Italian astronomer Stefano Mottola at ESO's La Silla Observatory using the Bochum 0.61-metre Telescope. Lightcurve analysis gave a rotation period of 22.741 hours with a brightness amplitude of 0.14 magnitude. A previous observation by Mottola gave a similar period of 22.77 hours from a lower-rated lightcurve.

Diameter and albedo 

According to the surveys carried out by the Infrared Astronomical Satellite IRAS, the Japanese Akari satellite and the NEOWISE mission of NASA's Wide-field Infrared Survey Explorer, Sarpedon measures between 77.48 and 108.21 kilometers in diameter and its surface has an albedo between 0.027 and 0.051.

The Collaborative Asteroid Lightcurve Link adopts the results obtained by IRAS, that is, an albedo of 0.034 and a diameter of 94.63 kilometers based on an absolute magnitude of 9.41.

Naming 

This minor planet was named from Greek mythology after the Lycian hero Sarpedon from the Iliad, who was killed by Patroclus,  during the Trojan War. The official naming citation was published by the Minor Planet Center on 1 August 1981.

References

External links 
 Asteroid Lightcurve Database (LCDB), query form (info )
 Dictionary of Minor Planet Names, Google books
 Discovery Circumstances: Numbered Minor Planets (1)-(5000) – Minor Planet Center
 
 

002223
002223
Named minor planets
002223
19771004